The Nightingale in the Mountains (Spanish: El ruiseñor de las cumbres) is a 1958 Spanish musical film directed by Antonio del Amo and starring Joselito, Roberto Camardiel and Dolores Villaespesa. Written by Jaime Garcia-Herranz with the original title of Once upon a time there was a shepherd (Spanish: Era una vez un pastor) it is the last film of what was called the Nightingale trilogy, which included The Little Nightingale (Spanish: El Pequeño Ruiseñor) (1956) and The Song of the Nightingale (Spanish: Saeta del ruiseñor) (1957).

The film's sets were designed by Enrique Alarcón. It was filmed in the Spanish locations of Alcalá de la Selva and Mora de Rubielos, as per the insistence of the writer, Jaime Garcia-Herranz, natural of Mora de Rubielos.

Plot 
Joselito is a boy, with a prodigious voice, who spends most of his time in the mountains taking care of a flock of sheep. One fine day he discovers that the fruit of his work ends in drunkenness for his father and decides to try his luck in life through music, for which he associates with the cunning Peppino.

Cast

Joselito as Joselito
Roberto Camardiel as Peppino
Dolores Villaespesa as Manuela, Joselito's mother
Antonio Casas as Sebastián, Joselito's father
 as owner of the villa
Félix Fernández as Dueño puesto de feria
José Moratalla as Crispín 
Adela Carboné
Domingo Rivas as Don Javier
Rosa Fúster
Juan García Delgado as Alcalde
Juana Cáceres as owner's wife
José Cuenca as Sr. Félix
Francisco Gómez Delgado as doctor
Emilia Zambrano
Mery Leyva as Camarera
María Teresa Campos as visitor at the villa
Carmelo G. Robledo
José Mayordomo

References

External links

1958 musical films
Spanish musical films
Films directed by Antonio del Amo
Films produced by Cesáreo González
Films scored by Augusto Algueró
1950s Spanish films